Charles John Howard, 17th Earl of Suffolk, 10th Earl of Berkshire (7 November 1805 – 14 August 1876), styled Viscount Andover between 1820 and 1851, was a British peer and Whig politician.

Background
Suffolk was the son of Thomas Howard, 16th Earl of Suffolk, and the Hon. Elizabeth Jane, daughter of James Dutton, 1st Baron Sherborne. He was the brother of Henry Thomas Howard and James Howard.

Political career
Suffolk was returned to Parliament for Malmesbury in 1832, a seat he held until 1841. In 1851 he succeeded his father as seventeenth Earl of Suffolk and entered the House of Lords.

Family
Lord Suffolk married his kinswoman Isabella Catherine, daughter of Lord Henry Thomas Howard-Molyneux-Howard (brother of Bernard Howard, 12th Duke of Norfolk), in 1829. They had seven children:

Lady Isabella Julia Elizabeth Howard (15 April 1831 – 8 October 1910), married Maj. Francis Henry Atherley (1831-1897), had issue, Rifle Brigade
Henry Charles Howard, 18th Earl of Suffolk (1833–1898)
Hon. Greville Theophilus Howard (22 December 1836 – 28 July 1880), married Lady Audrey Townshend, daughter of John Townshend, 4th Marquess Townshend and had issue, a barrister
Lady Mary Charlotte Henrietta Howard (1840 - 07 May 1872)
Lt. Hon. Bernard Thomas Howard (21 August 1841 – 25 September 1868), Rifle Brigade
Lady Victoria Margaret Louisa Howard (3 March 1844 - 4 January 1906)
Hon. Cecil Molyneux Howard (30 March 1849 – 28 April 1903), married Amy Schuster, without issue

He died in August 1876, aged 70, and was succeeded in his titles by his eldest son, Henry. The Countess of Suffolk died in June 1891.

References

External links 

1805 births
1876 deaths
Charles
Charles
Charles Howard, 17th Earl of Suffolk
Members of the Parliament of the United Kingdom for English constituencies
UK MPs 1832–1835
UK MPs 1835–1837
UK MPs 1837–1841
Suffolk, E17
Deputy Lieutenants of Wiltshire
Whig (British political party) MPs